Gordon Wallace, AO, FAA, FTSE, FIOP, FRACI (born 9 June 1958 in Belfast, Northern Ireland) is a leading scientist in the field of electromaterials. His students and collaborators have pioneered the use of nanotechnology in conjunction with organic conductors to create new materials for energy conversion and storage as well as medical bionics. He has developed new approaches to fabrication that allow material properties discovered in the nano world to be translated into micro structures and macro scopic devices.

Wallace's research interests include the discovery of new materials and the use of these in energy and biomedical devices.

Executive research director at the ARC Centre of Excellence for Electromaterials Science and director of the Intelligent Polymer Research Institute and the Australian National Fabrication Facility (Materials Node) both headquartered at the University of Wollongong.

Early years 
Wallace was born in the city of Belfast in Ireland where he attended primary school. His boyhood ambition was to become a professional soccer player. However, in 1972 his family emigrated to Australia and settled in Geelong where he completed his high school education. He became interested in science while at Oberon High School.

He went to Deakin University in Geelong and played soccer for the local Geelong football club. Wallace played soccer for the All Australian University team winning a University Blue for Sport at Deakin.

Wallace graduated with a BSc Honours (chemistry and physics) in 1979 and then received a PhD in 1983. He returned to his home country, Ireland, where he lectured for two years at University College in Cork. In 1985 he decided to return to Australia to take up an appointment at the University of Wollongong. In 1990, at the age of 32, he was appointed a professor.

He was awarded an Australian Research Council QEII Fellowship in 1991, an ARC Senior Research Fellowship in 1995, an ARC Professorial Fellowship in 2002 and a Federation Fellowship in 2006. He was awarded a DSc from Deakin University in 2000.

Research years 
Wallace's first major contribution to science was to challenge the conventional wisdom that instability in polymer materials should always be eliminated. He asserted that this instability could, if understood, be directed and controlled, allowing the creation of "intelligent" polymers – materials that sense and respond to stimuli.

In 1990, Wallace established the world's first intelligent polymer research laboratory in NSW. His work has more recently been focused on exploring the development and use of such materials in biomolecular technologies – he has led a number of initiatives in developing the field of organic bionics.

He has developed collaborative research relationships with the inventor of the Cochlear Bionic Ear, Professor Graeme Clark as well as Professor Stephen O'Leary, Professor Peter Choong, and Professor Mark Cook which have led to significant developments in the field of new materials for medical bionics. He has now established a significant national clinic network with others including Professor Chris Baker, Professor Michael Coote, Professor Toby Coates, Professor Gerard Sutton, Professor Stuart MacKay, Professor Morteza Mori Aghmesheh, Dr Payal Mukherjee and Professor Xu-Feng Huang.

Wallace has played a significant role in helping to lift the international research reputation of the University of Wollongong. He has hosted more than twenty international symposia in Wollongong, the largest being the International Conference on Synthetic Metals that attracted 1,000 delegates in 2004. He is a chair of the upcoming International Conference on Nanoscience and Nanotechnology 2018 (ICONN).

He has published more than 850 refereed papers and monographs on inherently conducting polymers for intelligent material systems, as well as the book Organic Bionics. He has an h index of 79 and has amassed in excess of 30,000 citations. He has supervised the work of almost 100 PhD students. In addition to being awarded a number of research prizes, Wallace was elected a Fellow of the Australian Academy of Technological Sciences and Engineering in 2003 and of the Australian Academy of Science in 2007.

He was appointed as an Officer of the Order of Australia and Wollongong's Australia Day Ambassador in 2017.

Later that year he was named the 2017 NSW Scientist of the Year.

He received the Inaugural Polymer Science and Technology award from the Royal Australian Chemical Institute (RACI) in 1992. He was awarded an ETS Walton Fellowship by Science Foundation Ireland in 2003. In 2009 he was awarded a lifetime achievement award by SPIE.

He was appointed to the Prime Ministers Knowledge Nation 100 in 2015. He received the Eureka Prize for Leadership in Science and Innovation in 2016.

He was elected as a Fellow of the Australian Academy of Technological Sciences and Engineering in 2003. He received the RACI Stokes Medal for research in Electrochemistry in 2004 and was elected as a Fellow of the Institute of Physics (UK). In 2007 he was elected as a Fellow of the Australian Academy of Science

In September 2008, Wallace's team moved to research facilities at the University of Wollongong's new Innovation Campus based at North Wollongong.

He was instrumental in developing the vision and securing the funding for the Processing and Device Fabrication Facility opened in 2012.

Awards and distinctions 
The significance of Wallace's contributions to electrochemistry and polymer science has been recognised with a number of awards. A selection of these awards and distinctions are listed here:
 Corresponding Member Academy of Science, Bologna, 2016
 Distinguished Visiting Professor, Shinshu University, Japan, 2014–present
 Awarded Honorary Doctorate in Chemical Engineering (DSc), Hanbat University, Korea, 2014
 Business Events Sydney's Ambassador, 2013–present
 UOW Vice Chancellor's Award for Interdisciplinary Research, 2013
 Australian Research Council (ARC) Laureate Fellowship, 2011
 Special Advisor (International Research) to the President, Hanbat University, Korea, 2011–2014
 Professor, Korean World Class University Program, 2009–2011

Select publications 

 "The use of microelectrodes to probe the electropolymerization mechanism of heterocyclic conducting polymers" - Journal of Electroanalytical Chemistry (1991)
 "Development of a polypyrrole-based human serum albumin sensor" - Analytica Chimica Acta (1991)
 "Incorporation of Erythrocytes into Polypyrrole to Form the Basis of a Biosensor to Screen for Rhesus (D) Blood Groups and Rhesus (D) Antibodies" - Electroanalysis (1999)
 "Enantioselective electropolymerization of aniline in the presence of (+)- or (-)- camphorsulfonate ion: a facile route to conducting polymers with preferred one-screw-sense helicity" - Polymer (1994)
 "A Single Component Conducting Polymer Hydrogel as a Scaffold for Tissue Engineering" - Advanced Functional Materials (2012)
 "Physical Surface and Electromechanical Properties of Doped Polypyrrole Biomaterials" - Biomaterials (2010)
 "Resolving Sub-Molecular Binding and Electrical Switching Mechanisms of Single Proteins at Electroactive Conducting Polymers" - Small (2013)
 "Mechanism of electromechanical actuation in polypyrrole" - Synthetic Metals (1995)
 "High-Performance Multifunctional Graphene Yarns: Toward Wearable All-Carbon Energy Storage Textiles" - ACS Nano (2014)
 "Effect of the counterion employed during synthesis on the properties of polypyrrole membranes" - Journal of Membrane Science (1994)
 "Pulsed amperometric detection of proteins using antibody containing conducting polymers" - Analytica Chimica Acta (1993)
 "Strain Response From Polypyrrole Actuators Under Load" - Advanced Functional Materials (2002)
 "Use of Ionic Liquids for p-Conjugated Polymer Electrochemical Devices" - Science (2002)
 "Skeletal Muscle Cell Proliferation and Differentiation on Polypyrrole Substrates Doped with Extracellular Matrix Components" - Biomaterials (2009)
 "Bio-ink for on-demand printing of living cells" - Biomaterials Science (2013)
 "Development of the Biopen: A handheld device for surgical printing of adipose stem cells at a chondral wound site" - Biofabrication (2016)
 "3D printing of layered brain-like structures using peptide modified gellan gum substrates" - Biomaterials (2015)
 "Processable aqueous dispersions of graphene nanosheets" - Nature Nanotechnology (2008)
 "Mechanically Strong, Electrically Conductive, and Biocompatible Graphene Paper" - Advanced Materials (2008)
 "Carbon Nanotube Actuators" - Science (1999)

References 

1958 births
Living people
Academic staff of the University of Wollongong
Fellows of the Australian Academy of Science
Irish scientists
British nanotechnologists
Fellows of the Australian Academy of Technological Sciences and Engineering